Irma la Douce ("Irma the Sweet") is a 1963 American romantic comedy film directed by Billy Wilder from a screenplay he co-wrote with I. A. L. Diamond, based on the 1956 French stage musical of the same name by Marguerite Monnot and Alexandre Breffort. The film stars Jack Lemmon and Shirley MacLaine.

Plot
Nestor Patou, an honest policeman, has been transferred from the Bois de Boulogne to Les Halles, a more urban neighborhood in Paris. He finds a street full of prostitutes working at the Hotel Casanova and raids the place. The inspector fires Nestor, who is mistakenly framed for bribery.

Kicked off the force and humiliated, Nestor finds himself drawn to the very neighborhood that ended his career with the Paris police—returning to Chez Moustache, a popular tavern for prostitutes and pimps. Down on his luck, Nestor befriends Irma la Douce, a popular prostitute. He reluctantly accepts, as a confidante, the proprietor of Chez Moustache, a man known only as Moustache. In a running joke, Moustache tells of a storied prior life, claiming to have been, among other things, an attorney, a colonel in the Foreign Legion, and a doctor who worked with Albert Schweitzer in Africa, ending with the repeated line, "but that's another story". After saving Irma from her abusive pimp, Hippolyte, Nestor moves in with her, and unwittingly becomes a new one.

Nestor becomes infatuated and devises a plan to derail Irma's life as a prostitute. With the help of Moustache, Nestor disguises himself as Lord X, a wealthy English lord, who becomes Irma's sole client. Lord X has supposedly been rendered impotent by his service in World War II but is eager to support her in exchange for two visits each week. To pay for Lord X's exclusive access, Nestor works in the marketplace. With Lord X away every night and too tired to make love, Irma thinks he is having an affair.

Irma seduces Lord X and persuades him to take her to England. At that point, Nestor decides to end the charade and kill off his alter ego. Unaware he is being tailed by Hippolyte, he tosses his disguise into the Seine. Seeing Lord X's clothes floating in the water, Hippolyte concludes Nestor killed him.

Arrested and sent to prison, Nestor escapes when he discovers that Irma is pregnant. He narrowly avoids being recaptured when the police search for him at the apartment; donning his old uniform, Nestor blends in with the other police and eludes capture.

With the help of Hippolyte, Nestor arranges for the police to search for him along the Seine from which, dressed as Lord X, he emerges. Vindicated of the murder, Nestor and Irma agree to get married. At the church, Irma goes into labor and has their baby. Moustache identifies the real Lord X as a guest. As Lord X leaves, a clearly baffled Moustache looks at the audience.

Cast

Production
The film was conceived in 1962 as a vehicle for Marilyn Monroe. The project would have reunited her with Wilder and Lemmon, both of whom had worked with her on Some Like It Hot. After Monroe's death, Shirley MacLaine was cast in the film after starring in The Apartment. MacLaine was paid $350,000 plus a percentage.

Reception
The film was successful, grossing $25,246,588 worldwide on a budget of $5 million. It was the fifth highest-grossing film of 1963, earning an estimated $12 million in North America. Irma la Douce earned over $15 million in worldwide rentals, but because of profit participation for Wilder and the two stars, United Artists only made a profit of $440,000 during the film's theatrical run.

Bosley Crowther of The New York Times called it "a brisk and bubbly film" with Lemmon "little short of brilliant" and MacLaine having "a wonderously casual and candid air that sweeps indignation before it and leaves one sweetly enamoured of her." Variety praised the "scintillating performances" by Lemmon and MacLaine but thought that the film "lacks the originality of some of Wilder's recent efforts" and that the 147-minute running time was "an awfully long haul for a frivolous farce." Philip K. Scheuer of the Los Angeles Times reported that "I found it a brilliant, though outrageously outspoken comedy." Richard L. Coe of The Washington Post panned the film as "overblown and overlong, two hours and three quarters tediously spent on a single joke." The Monthly Film Bulletin wrote, "Though the film stretches for two and a third hours, and rarely ventures away from the two principals and the studio-built Rue Casanova, the humour and spontaneity endure surprisingly well ... most credit goes to Shirley MacLaine and Jack Lemmon for yet another tour de force of comedy playing." The film gave 76% ratings on Rotten Tomatoes based on 21 reviews.

Accolades

Soundtrack

All compositions by André Previn, using themes by Marguerite Monnot.

 "Main Title" – 2:14
 "Meet Irma" – 1:42
 "This Is the Story" – 3:16
 "Nestor the Honest Policeman" – 1:54
 "Our Language of Love" – 2:04
 "Don't Take All Night" – 5:43
 "The Market" – 6:28
 "Easy Living the Hard Way" – 3:16
 "Escape" – 2:13
 "Wedding Ring" – 1:35
 "The Return of Lord X" – 1:24
 "In the Tub with Fieldglasses" – 2:27
 "Goodbye Lord X" – 3:17
 "I'm Sorry Irma" – 1:38
 "Juke Box: Let's Pretend Love" – 3:07
 "Juke Box: Look Again" – 2:16
 "But That's Another Story" – 0:38

The film also features an a cappella enticement song set to the tune of Alouette.

Remakes
 Irma la Douce was remade for French television in 1972.
The film was remade in Turkey as Kırmızı Fener Sokağı in 1968
 The film was remade in India as the controversial film Manoranjan with Sanjeev Kumar and Zeenat Aman, reprising the roles of Jack Lemmon and Shirley MacLaine respectively.

Others
In 1968, the Egyptian film Afrit Mirati (My Wife's Goblin) starring Salah Zulfikar and Shadia, contained a soundtrack titled Irma la Douce performed by Shadia. The Egyptian film Khamsa Bab (Door Five) was based on the story in Irma la Douce, with Nadia El Guindy playing the part of Tragy, the Egyptian Irma character.

See also
 List of Egyptian films of 1968
 List of American films of 1963
 Salah Zulfikar on screen, stage and radio

References

External links
 
 
 
 
 

1963 films
1963 romantic comedy films
1960s English-language films
1960s sex comedy films
American films based on plays
American romantic comedy films
American sex comedy films
Films about prostitution in Paris
Films based on musicals
Films directed by Billy Wilder
Films featuring a Best Musical or Comedy Actress Golden Globe winning performance
Films scored by André Previn
Films that won the Best Original Score Academy Award
Films with screenplays by Billy Wilder
Films with screenplays by I. A. L. Diamond
United Artists films
1960s American films